Atlantic Bird was a series of satellites operated by Eutelsat over the Atlantic Ocean. In 2012 the series was merged into Eutelsat's main fleet as part of the company's rebranding.

Two of the original three satellites replaced the France Telecom Telecom 2 satellites which Eutelsat had acquired in 1999. Five satellites were in operation as of 2006:
Atlantic Bird 1, operating at 12.5°W
Atlantic Bird 2, launched in September 2001 and operating at 8°W (Replaced Telecom 2A)
Atlantic Bird 3, a Spacebus 3000B3, operating at 5°W (Replaced Telecom 2C)
Atlantic Bird 4, operated at 7°W (Formerly Hot Bird 4, also known as Nilesat 103)
Atlantic Bird 7, launched in September 2011 and operating at 7°W

References

Communications satellites